Richard Jenčík (born January 1, 1985) is a former Slovak ice hockey player.

Career
Jenčik previously spent the majority of his career playing for HC Košice. He also had spells with MHK Kežmarok as well as a spell in the Polska Hokej Liga for KS Cracovia.

Career statistics

International

References

External links
 

1985 births
Living people
HC Košice players
HC Prešov players
MHK Kežmarok players
MKS Cracovia (ice hockey) players
MsHK Žilina players
Podhale Nowy Targ players
Slovak ice hockey right wingers
Sportspeople from Košice
Slovak expatriate ice hockey people
Expatriate ice hockey players in Poland
Slovak expatriate sportspeople in Poland